Lord Johnson may refer to:

Jo Johnson, Baron Johnson of Marylebone (born 1971), British politician
Dominic Johnson, Baron Johnson of Lainston (born 1974), British financier, hedge fund manager and politician